Christopher Chace Crawford (born July 18, 1985) is an American actor. He is known for his television portrayals of Nate Archibald on The CW's teen drama series Gossip Girl (2007–2012), and of The Deep in Amazon Prime Video original series The Boys (2019–present). He is also known for starring in the films The Covenant (2006), The Haunting of Molly Hartley (2008), Twelve (2010), and What to Expect When You're Expecting (2012). In 2015, he  portrayed Billy LeFever in ABC's short-lived drama series Blood & Oil.

Early life and education
Crawford was born in Lubbock, Texas. His father, Chris, is a dermatologist, and his mother, Dana, is a teacher. He has a younger sister, former Miss Missouri USA winner and Miss USA contestant Candice Crawford. Crawford was raised a Southern Baptist. While his father was a medical student, Chace lived in Bloomington, Minnesota, for four years, attending Ridgeview Elementary School. When his father completed his training, the family moved back to Texas and settled in Plano, a suburb of Dallas.

During high school, he worked in an Abercrombie & Fitch store and modeled for Hollister. He graduated from Trinity Christian Academy in Addison, Texas, in 2003. Following graduation, Crawford attended Pepperdine University, studying broadcast journalism and marketing, but dropped out after a few semesters to focus on his acting career. He temporarily worked as a car valet to make ends meet.

Career

2006–12: Beginnings and Gossip Girl

Crawford made his film debut in the 2006 supernatural horror-thriller The Covenant, as Tyler Simms. In March 2007, he landed the role of main character Nate Archibald on The CW's teen drama series Gossip Girl, making his television debut. In 2008, Crawford co-starred in the crime-thriller Loaded, and portrayed the lead role in the supernatural horror film The Haunting of Molly Hartley. The following year, he played English singer-songwriter Leona Lewis' boyfriend in the video for her single "I Will Be", which was released in January 2009. That same year, Crawford was named "Summer's Hottest Bachelor" by People.

Crawford has also done a public service announcement for Do Something's Teens for Jeans campaign. He then portrayed the lead role, a drug dealer named White Mike, in the film Twelve, directed by Joel Schumacher. Based on Nick McDonell's novel of the same name, the film premiered at Sundance Film Festival on January 31, 2010. He was tapped to play the lead in the remake of Footloose, even beginning rehearsals for the role, before dropping out after a number of weeks. Kenny Wormald was eventually cast for the role.

In 2011, Crawford starred in the film Peace, Love & Misunderstanding alongside Jane Fonda and Catherine Keener. He portrayed a war-protesting butcher named Cole, a love interest of one of the main characters. In 2012, Crawford starred alongside Cameron Diaz and Jennifer Lopez in What to Expect When You're Expecting, directed by Kirk Jones. It is a film adaptation of the book of the same name by Heidi Murkoff. Crawford played Marco in one of the film's interlocking stories. His character reunited with an old flame after a turf war between their food trucks, and they embarked on a journey together in the wake of a surprise pregnancy.

2013–present: Film roles and The Boys

In January 2014, Crawford signed on to guest star  on the 100th episode of the Fox comedy-drama series Glee as Biff McIntosh, Quinn Fabray's (Dianna Agron) new boyfriend, which aired on March 18, 2014. In March 2014, Crawford landed the lead role of Cooper Pollard in the independent comedy Mountain Men. The film follows two brothers who do not get along as they take a trip to the mountain to look for their missing father, however they get stuck there and have no other choice but to work together to get back home. The film co-stars Tyler Labine.

In April 2014, it was reported that Crawford had landed the lead role of Jacob Martin in the psychological thriller film Eloise, directed by Robert Legato and written by Chris Borrelli. The film is about four friends who break into an asylum so Jacob could get an inheritance of the death certificate. Once inside the asylum, they discover the truth about their tragic past. It also stars Eliza Dushku, Brandon T. Jackson, and PJ Byrne. On March 11, 2015, it was reported that Crawford had been cast in ABC's primetime soap opera Blood & Oil, portraying the lead role of Billy LeFever. The series was cancelled after a short run of 10 episodes.

In 2016, Crawford played the role Arthur Barone in the independent sports comedy-drama film Undrafted, written and directed by Joe Mazzello. Based on the true story of a promising young baseball player, the project was filmed at Dunsmore Park in La Crescenta, California. Also that year, he had a minor role in the film Rules Don't Apply, written and directed by Warren Beatty.

In April 2016, it was announced that Crawford had landed the role of Egon in the comedy film I Do...Until I Don't opposite Amber Heard and Ed Helms. The film was written and directed by Lake Bell. In the same month, it was reported by TheWrap that he would perform in a live-reading of the Black List script College Republicans, portraying the role of John F. Kinney. The reading took place at the Montalban Theater on April 23, 2016. In March 2017, it was announced that Crawford had joined the cast of the comedy show Casual in the recurring role of Byron. The same year, he signed on to star in the crime movie Riptide as Landen and comedy film All About Nina as Joe.

In January 2018, it was announced that Crawford has been cast as Kevin Moskowitz/The Deep in The Boys, the Amazon Studios adaptation of Garth Ennis and Darick Robertson's comic book of the same name. As of 2022, the show has been renewed for a fourth season. In February, he was cast in the Charles Manson biopic drama-thriller film Charlie Says as murderer Tex Watson, which released later that year. In March 2019, Crawford was announced to join Lily Collins in Vaughn Stein's thriller Inheritance. It was released on May 2020. In the same year, he starred in thriller Nighthawks.

In August 2021, Crawford was announced to star alongside Nina Dobrev in ensemble comedy Reunion from director Chris Nelson. In October 9, Crawford did an uncredited cameo on a Saturday Night Live episode in a The Bachelorette parody skit. In December, Crawford was announced to voice act in the English-language version of Mamoru Hosoda's 2021 sci-fi anime, Belle. It was released the following month alongside the Japanese-language version on January 14, 2022. In February 2022, it was announced that Crawford would develop a football drama at Showtime, alongside former Dallas Cowboys quarterback Tony Romo, who is also Crawford's brother-in-law, and Yellowjackets executive producer Drew Comins. In March, Crawford reprised the role of his The Boys character, Kevin Moskowitz/The Deep, in the fifth episode of its adult animated anthology spin-off, The Boys Presents: Diabolical.

Personal life
Crawford shared an apartment with his Gossip Girl co-star Ed Westwick in Chelsea, Manhattan, at the beginning of the series in 2007 until July 2009, when Crawford moved out to rent an apartment in the Wall Street area. Crawford's brother in-law is former Dallas Cowboys quarterback Tony Romo. He practices Transcendental Meditation, which he says is like "a natural Xanax".

Filmography

Film

Television

Web series
 Vought News Network: Seven on 7 with Cameron Coleman (2021), as Kevin Moskowitz / The Deep

Awards and nominations

References

External links

 
 Chace Crawford cast bio at The CW

1985 births
Living people
21st-century American male actors
American male film actors
Male models from Texas
American male television actors
Male actors from Texas
People from Lubbock, Texas
Male actors from Dallas
Pepperdine University alumni
People from Chelsea, Manhattan